The communauté de communes Marche Avenir  is a former intercommunality in the Creuse département of the Limousin  region of central France. It was created in January 1993. It was merged into the new Communauté de communes Portes de la Creuse en Marche in January 2014.

It comprised the following 6 communes:

La Cellette
La Forêt-du-Temple
Linard
Mortroux
Moutier-Malcard
Nouziers

See also
Communes of the Creuse department

References  

Marche Avenir